Big Crow is a 2022 American documentary film directed by Kris Kaczor. The film examines the life and impact of SuAnne Big Crow, a young Lakota basketball player who used her talents to fight racism, violence, drugs and alcohol on Pine Ridge Indian Reservation in South Dakota. In 1989 Suanne made history, bringing the first-ever class A girls state basketball championship to a native high school. Her tragic death in a car accident in 1992 served to cement her legacy as an activist and gave power to a voice that remains effective today, thirty years after her death.

Cast
 SuAnne Big Crow
 Leticia “Chick” Big Crow
 Cecelia “CeCe” Big Crow
 Frances “Pigeon” Big Crow
 Kellee Brewer
 Angie Big Crow
 Toni Morton 
 Rayette Provost
 Bryan Brewer
 Bamm Brewer
 Raymond Eagle Hawk Jr.

Release 
Big Crow had its premiere at the Santa Barbara International Film Festival in 2022.

References

External links
 
 
 

2022 films
2022 documentary films
Documentary films about Native Americans
2020s English-language films